Marcantonius Majoragio (1514–1555)  was a writer and philosopher, active in Northern Italy during the Renaissance period.

Biography 
Majoragio was born Antonio Maria Conti in a place in the proximity of Milan in Italy, known as Majoragio (Mairago).

Majoragio was professor for a time at Milan, and a scholar who was known to have studied after the ancient Roman philosopher and orator  Cicero. During 1542 he attended lectures held within Ferrara, these lectures were performed by Maggi on the subject of philosophy, and by Alciati on jurisprudence.  He occupied an intellectual position both in defence of Cicero, in respect to Calcagnini's attack on the work De Officiis  and contrary and in some way hostile, in respect to the work Paradoxa Stoicorum, in this case in his own work Antiparadoxon. In Antiparadoxon Majoragio expressed the thought that Cicero's work was composed of dialogues which were un-Socratic, and more over, that Cicero's work was in fact demonstrably untrue.

Majoragio believed in Platonic Christianity, and thought that those who  expressed contrary thoughts, that there was no after-life and the present material world was the only world that exists should be righteously condemned to the fate of having themselves burnt alive, and additionally those punished thus, to be in full consciousness during such an act.

Works
Majoragio produced the following:

A 1546 work of criticism against Paradoxa Stoicorum
A 1547 commentary on Aristotle's - Rhetoric.
A 1552 commentary on Orator written by Cicero.
A commentary on the first book of De Oratore written by Cicero, published 1587.

References

1514 births
1555 deaths
16th-century Italian philosophers
Italian philosophers